Luton Town Hall is a building at the junction between Manchester Street, Upper George Street and George Street, Luton, England; the current building was completed in 1936 on the site of the older Town Hall, which was burnt down 19 July 1919, following the Peace Day Riots. The current hall, which is the headquarters of Luton Borough Council, is a Grade II listed building.

History

First town hall

The original Town Hall was built in the classical style with Doric columns supporting a frieze designed by Luton architects John Williams and Sons in 1846 and was built for a total cost excluding the purchasing of the land for £2,200. In 1856 a small tower and clock was added in commemoration of the Crimean War. It was built by the Town Hall Company to hold public meetings and entertainment in the town and was only brought into public ownership by the Luton Local Board of Health in 1874. The building became the headquarters of Luton Borough Council after it succeeded the Local Board of Health in 1876.

On Peace Day, 19 July 1919, a crowd of ex-servicemen unhappy with unemployment and other grievances assembled. The riot started after members of the council arrived to read out the proclamation of peace and many in the crowd expressed their disapproval. Tension boiled over into violence and a number of protesters broke through the police line and forcibly entered the town hall. Shortly after a number of violent clashes took place, with the town hall being stormed by the crowd and eventually set on fire.

Order was eventually restored to the town by midnight on 19 July, but the fire brigade were unable to extinguish the fire and by the next morning the town hall was little more than ruins. The remains of the building were demolished in August 1919 and the statue "Peace", which was designed by Sir Reginald Blomfield and inscribed with the names of dead servicemen from World War I, was unveiled in 1922. Following the destruction of the building the town's administration was carried out from the Carnegie library.

Second town hall
It was determined the original site offered the best location in the town for a replacement town hall and, in 1930, a competition was held for designs for the new town hall: there were 86 entries to the competition. The competition was won by Bradshaw Gass & Hope from Bolton with a neoclassical style design incorporating Art Deco features. It was built with a steel frame and clad in grey Portland Stone and was officially opened by The Duke of Kent on 28 October 1936. Many of the interior features were designed to recall images from the town's coat of arms, which was carved in stone above the main entrance: the bee, the wheatsheaf, the rose and the thistle. The bell installed was the heaviest in the county, weighing approximately two tonnes.

During the Second World War, the clock tower was camouflaged to protect it during air raids as the bright white stonework would have been highly visible from the air.

The town hall continued to serve as the headquarters of the borough council for much of the 20th century and remained a meeting place for the enlarged Luton Borough Council which was formed in 1974. During the 1980s a modern extension was built on Manchester Street to provide additional office space.

References

Further reading
 D. Craddock, (1999) Where They Burnt the Town Hall Down: Luton, the First World War and the Peace Day Riots of July 1919, Book Castle, 
 J. G. Dony, (1978) The 1919 Peace Riots in Luton, Bedfordshire Historical Record Society, volume 57, 205–233.

External links

2019 events to commemorate the centenary of the Peace Day riots 

Government buildings completed in 1846
Government buildings completed in 1936
Listed buildings in Luton
City and town halls in Bedfordshire
Grade II listed buildings in Bedfordshire
1919 riots in the United Kingdom
Bradshaw, Gass & Hope buildings
1846 establishments in England